Eagleheart is an American action comedy TV series that aired on the programming block Adult Swim. Eagleheart was produced by Conan O'Brien's production company, Conaco, and stars Chris Elliott as Chris Monsanto. The series aired from 2011 to 2014.

Premise
Eagleheart follows US Marshal Chris Monsanto as he fights crime with his two partners: the slow-witted Brett and by-the-book Susie. They take on drug smugglers, art thieves, kidnappers, and con artists with bloody violence and gruesome deaths ensuing. The Marshals report to The Chief, who gives them their assignments. There is little continuity between episodes in the first two seasons. The third season features an extended season-long storyline titled Paradise Rising.

Eagleheart parodies many cop shows, most notably Walker, Texas Ranger. It portrays a great deal of graphic violence.

Cast

Episodes

Series overview

Season 1 (2011)

Season 2 (2012)

Season 3 (2013–14)
Season three's linked story arc is called Paradise Rising. The first, fourth, and final episode run 22 minutes each.

International broadcast
In Canada, Eagleheart previously aired on G4's Adult Digital Distraction block, and currently airs on the Canadian version of Adult Swim.

References

External links
 
 
 

2010s American parody television series
2010s American police comedy television series
2011 American television series debuts
2014 American television series endings
Adult Swim original programming
American action comedy television series
English-language television shows
Television series by Conaco
Television series by Williams Street
United States Marshals Service in fiction